Maarjamäe Memorial is a memorial in Tallinn, Estonia. The memorial is located on Pirita Road between the Lasnamäe Plateau and Tallinn Bay. The memorial is dedicated to those who had fallen when defending the Soviet Union during the World War II.
Adjacent to the Maarjamae memorial complex is World War II German war cemetery.

The memorial is designed by architect Allan Murdmaa and sculptor , some parts are designed by architect Mart Port and sculptor .

The centre part of memorial is a 35-metre obelisk. The obelisk was erected in 1960. Besides the obelisk, the palm of the hand-prints and bronze seagulls named "Perishing seagulls" are also erected.

References

Soviet military memorials and cemeteries in Estonia
Tallinn